Dystomorphus nigrosignatus is a species of beetle in the family Cerambycidae. It was described by Pu, Wang and Li in 1998.

References

Saperdini
Beetles described in 1998